Strada statale 106 Jonica (SS 106) is an Italian state highway which extends for 491 km from Reggio Calabria to Taranto, covering the whole coast Jonica in Calabria, Basilicata and parts of Apulia. It constitutes a traffic route of national importance and is included in European route E90.

References 

106
Transport in Apulia
Transport in Basilicata
Transport in Calabria